Ani Abbas Manopo (born 4 May 1909, date of death unknown) was the first Indonesian woman to receive a law degree. She completed her studies at the College of Law (RHS or Rechts Hooge School) in Batavia (now Jakarta). She would go on to practice law in Sumatra and become dean of faculties at the University of North Sumatra and the State University of Medan.

Biography 
Ani Manopo was born on 4 May 1909 in Langowan, which is located in the region of Minahasa in North Sulawesi. Her parents were Wolter Manopo and Anna Massie. In 1915, she started attending a primary education Dutch language school called Speciale School, which is equivalent to the Dutch-Native School (HIS or Hollandsch-Inlandsche School). Then from 1923 to 1927, Manopo attended advanced primary school (MULO or Meer Uitgebreid Lager Onderwijs). This school was located in Tondano, which about 20 kilometers from Langowan. The next school Manopo attended was not in the island of Sulawesi, but in the island of Java. This high school level school was located in Bandung and called Algemene Middelbare School (AMS). Among Manopo's classmates were Mohammad Natsir and Sutan Sjahrir.

In 1930, Manopo started her studies at RHS Batavia. During this time, she met and married her husband, Abdul Abbas, who was also studying at RHS. Manopo graduated in 1935, becoming the first Indonesian woman to receive a law degree. In 1945, Manopo's husband was selected to be part of the Preparatory Committee for Indonesian Independence. After the proclamation of Indonesian independence, Abbas became the representative of the Indonesian government in Sumatra. Manopo followed her husband on a tour announcing the proclamation of independence throughout Sumatra all the way to Medan, which would be their eventual home.

In addition to practicing law, Manopo became involved in the formation of a Faculty of Law (or Fakultas Hukum) at the University of North Sumatra. She became dean of the faculty in 1955. In 1957, she was involved in the formation of a Faculty of Teacher Training and Education (FKIP or Fakultas Keguruan dan Ilmu Pendidikan) at the same university. She became of the dean of this faculty in 1957. This faculty would eventually become the State University of Medan.

References

Bibliography 

 
 
 
 
 
 
 
 
 
 

1909 births
Year of death missing
Minahasa people